San Juan Bautista is the main town in the Juan Fernández Islands of Chile. Some sources say it was founded in 1877, while others give an earlier date of 1750. It is located on Cumberland Bay on the center of the northeast coast of Robinson Crusoe Island.

Although the community maintains a rustic serenity dependent on the spiny lobster trade, residents employ a few vehicles, a satellite internet connection, and many television sets.

There is a soccer pitch at the northern end of the village. The nearby school is called the Dresden School, after the German light cruiser SMS Dresden which was sunk there during World War I, as is the street it is situated on. The names of other generally unpaved streets in the village include Larraín Alcalde, Ignacio Carrera Pinto, El Sándalo, Vicente González, Teniente Cortés, and La Pólvora.

Overlooking San Juan Bautista are Las Cuevas de los Patriotas (Patriots' Caves), where 42 Chilean creole independence activists lived during their exile by the Spanish authorities after the Battle of Rancagua in October 1814. The exiles included prominent figures such as Juan Egaña and Manuel de Salas.

Transportation
As of early 2010, a pair of ships operated by the Chilean Navy arrive each month from mainland Chile. The number of passengers is limited, so arrangements must be made as much as a month in advance. The navy gives preference to locals. One-way trip time is 24 – 36 hours or more depending on sea conditions.

There is a short,  airstrip at Robinson Crusoe Airfield in the southwestern end of the Robinson Crusoe Island, the only reasonably flat part of the island. Operations are mostly in twin-engine, seven-seat light planes, with very limited baggage capabilities. The flight time from the mainland of Chile is about 2 hours 30 minutes, plus a 1-hour 30 minute boat ferry to the village at the opposite side of the island.

Climate
San Juan Bautista has a very mild Mediterranean climate (Köppen Csb), with rainfall intermediate between that of Valparaíso and Concepción. Temperature is influenced by the cold Humboldt Current, which flows northward to the east of Robinson Crusoe Island, and the southeast trade winds.

2010 tsunami 
On February 27, 2010, at least eight people lost their lives when a tsunami caused by the Chilean 8.8 earthquake hit the island and inundated the town. Most of the buildings in the community were destroyed. The disaster could have been worse if not for a timely warning from a 12-year-old girl named Martina Maturana which saved many of her neighbors from harm.

References

External links 
 A map in this article shows the streets of the town.

Attribution
The original version of this article included text from the Wikipedia article Robinson Crusoe Island.

Juan Fernández Islands
Port settlements in Chile
Populated places in Valparaíso Province
Robinson Crusoe Island